Arminio or Chi la Dura la Vince   is an opera ("Dramma musicale") – and the earliest extant opera composed in Salzburg – in three acts about the Germanic military hero Arminius, and the only surviving opera composed by Heinrich Ignaz Franz Biber, composed ca. 1690–1692 with an Italian libretto probably by Francesco Maria Raffaelini. The manuscript score is kept in the Carolino Augusteum of Salzburg.

Roles

Synopsis
Place and Time: Rome during the reign of emperor Tiberius.

The opera is about the story of the wife of Arminius, Thusnelda (Segesta) who becomes prisoner of Germanicus.

Recordings
H.I.F. Biber: Arminio, Salzburger Hofmusik, Il Dolcimelo.
Conductor: Wolfgang Brunner
Singers:
Gotthold Schwarz / Bernhard Landauer / Irena Troupova / Regina Schwarzer / Otto Rastbichler / Hermann Oswald / Barbara Schlick / Gerd Türk / Xenia Meijer / Florian Mehltretter / Gerd Kenda / Markus Forster
Recording date: April 1994
Label: CPO

See also
 Arminius (Bruch)
 Arminio
 Hermann und Thusnelda

References

 Piero Gelli, Filippo Poletti: Dizionario Dell'opera 2008, Dalai editore, 2007

1692 operas
Operas by Heinrich Ignaz Franz Biber
Italian-language operas
Operas
Operas set in antiquity
Operas based on real people
Operas set in Germany
Operas set in Italy
German patriotic songs
Cultural depictions of Arminius
Cultural depictions of Caligula
Cultural depictions of Tiberius
Cultural depictions of Nero
Songs about military officers